Demi is the fourth studio album by American singer Demi Lovato. It was released on May 10, 2013, by Hollywood Records. Looking to transition from her self-described "generic" third album Unbroken (2011), Lovato wanted her fourth album to "have songs that excited her". Demi is primarily a pop record with elements of synthpop, and bubblegum pop.

Demi received generally favorable reviews from music critics, who complimented Lovato's vocal performance. The album debuted at number three on the US Billboard 200 with first-week sales of 110,000 copies. The album also reached the top five in Canada, Ireland, Italy, Mexico and Spain. It has since sold 490,000 digital copies in the US and been certified Gold by the RIAA.

The album's lead single, "Heart Attack" peaked at number ten on the Billboard Hot 100, marking Lovato's third US top-ten single, and has been certified double platinum by the RIAA. The second single "Made in the USA" peaked at number 80, while later singles "Neon Lights" and "Really Don't Care" both reached the top 40 peaking at 36 and 26, respectively, and both have been certified platinum by RIAA. Lovato supported the album in two concert tours: The Neon Lights Tour in early 2014 and the Demi World Tour between late 2014 and 2015.

Background
In April 2012, Lovato began writing songs for her fourth studio album, following the commercial success of her third studio album Unbroken (2011). The album was recorded during Lovato's appearance as a mentor during the second season of The X Factor. Lovato chose the title of the album Demi, because it was her first album intended for a more mainstream audience, and those who did not know her music. Lovato also explained a "sequel" of the song "Skyscraper" (2011) is included. After the album was released, it was revealed that "Warrior" was intended to be a sequel of "Skyscraper". She stated, "I'm incredibly proud of this album" and "It's better than anything I have ever done! I experimented with a variety of different sounds and poured my heart into writing these songs. I'm so excited for everyone to finally get the chance to hear them!" On May 6, 2013, Lovato asked her Twitter followers to "unlock" the entire album by putting song titles in hashtags. A special website lovaticsspeeduptime.com was launched, displaying all the songs next to a clock that would turn as tweets would be sent. Once a song became a trending topic, its YouTube video was made available on VEVO. All the songs were unlocked within four hours. An iBooks-exclusive e-book titled Demi: The Book was released on June 11, 2013. The book gives fans behind-the-scenes access to the singer, including never-before-seen footage and interviews. In one clip, she says that being honest and open is not only the message she is sending her fans in the book but also on her album. She said, "This album I've had enough time to really reflect on personal experiences and look back at my life after having overcome a bunch of things. I've been more aware of myself; therefore, when you listen to the album, you can really tell in the lyrics and in the emotion and everything I worked really, really hard on this album, and hopefully you'll be able to hear that."

Composition

Lovato described Demi as "good old American pop music", which was deeply influenced by her breakout single "Give Your Heart a Break" and she felt the "super catchy" lyrics as well as the beat of the song resonated with fans, which she wanted to further explore on the album. According to Lovato, her previous album Unbroken contained songs that she got sick of "a lot faster", so she wanted to "have songs that excited" her on Demi. Musical genres on the album range from pop rock to synthpop and bubblegum pop. Apart from "catchy songs" such as the mid-tempo track "Without the Love", "emotional songs" are also included on Demi. This is demonstrated on "Shouldn't Come Back" and "Warrior", which Lovato states are too personal to perform live, comparing them to a song from Unbroken entitled "For the Love of a Daughter". Billboard states that "Warrior" has Lovato declaring herself "a phoenix that has risen from all-too-public ashes", with emotional lyrics such as: "I've got shame, I've got scars, that I will never show/I'm a survivor, in more ways than you'll know". Speaking of "Warrior", the singer stated: "That song was probably the hardest and easiest song to write on the album. I was writing about personal experiences, and it's the type of song where you can't fit all of it into one song". The theme of Americanism on the album is evident on the track "Made in the USA", a patriotic love song inspired by "American love stories" in the 1930s. The song incorporates pop, rock, and country. Stripped down piano ballads on Demi includes, "In Case", which contains lyrics about heartbreak and "Nightingale". The upbeat songs "Really Don't Care" and "Something That We're Not" are produced to suit Lovato's "overpowering pipes".

In June 2013, Lovato stated: "My life has changed so much. I am vulnerable and honest in this record, the way I've always wanted to be. I was ready to come out of the darkness". She referred to the writing process for the album as "therapeutic", further stating: "It helped me get rid of my demons, I am a warrior now. I've been through so much in the past years, it was hard to find the courage to get out of it and write about it, I was afraid no one would understand my message. I spent so much time trying to figure out what the right thing to do was, that I got distracted along the way by fun and temptations and that's why I ended up in rehab at 18."

Critical reception

The album received generally positive reviews from music critics. According to review aggregator Metacritic, the album has a score of 64/100 based on 6 reviews. Jason Lipshutz from Billboard gave a positive review, saying that "the singer has a strong grip on her skills as a performer, but is still chiseling away at the formula that works best for her as an artist, and is unwittingly putting that self-discovery on display here." Jon Caramanica from The New York Times also gave a positive review, saying that it is "[an] often impressive fourth album." Stephen Thomas Erlewine from AllMusic gave a more mixed review, rating the album three stars out of five, saying that "Ultimately, this isn't an album of purpose, it's a collection of moments, and it has just enough good ones to solidify Demi Lovato's comeback." Jody Rosen from Rolling Stone awarded the album three stars out of five, saying that "It's predictable stuff—sassy songs, lovelorn songs, a couple of pop-psych pep talks—but Lovato is good company, and her voice has gustiness and character."

Melissa Maerz from Entertainment Weekly, however, gave the album a mixed review and graded it C+, saying that "it's too bad that her new album Demi, sounds like such a decisive return to teen pop. Transformed from an edgier young woman back into America's sweetheart." Marc Hirsh from The Boston Globe was also mixed, saying that "Demi sounds like Lovato's grasping for hits, when she used to sound like she was making music and having fun." Melinda Newman from HitFix gave the album a B−, commenting "The problem with Demi is that too much of the music here is so generic that it could be any teen queen delivering these tunes." However, she went on to conclude "For those who are looking for a largely uptempo album that fits squarely into much of the pop landscape on radio today, Demi will be a pleasing fit."

Promotion

When discussing her plans for The Neon Lights Tour in December 2013, Lovato stated "I want it to be about girl empowerment, I want it to be a huge party." Its opening acts included girl groups Fifth Harmony and Little Mix, as well as Cher Lloyd on select dates. The tour covered 41 shows in total across North and South America, as well as Canada and Mexico, beginning in Vancouver on February 9, and closing on May 17 in Monterrey.

Not long after the closing of the Neon Lights Tour, Lovato announced her first world tour, entitled the Demi World Tour. The tour would bring new opening acts, Christina Perri and MKTO, as well as playing shows in bigger venues, such as the Staples Center. It would mark the first time one of Lovato's albums had spawned two separate concert tours. The 2014 dates consisted of 25 shows across North America and Canada, with world tour dates due for 2015. The tour began on September 6 in Baltimore, with the first leg concluding on October 27 at the Barclays Center in New York City.On November 28, 2014, Lovato announced shows in Australia and New Zealand, marking her first time performing in these countries. The leg consisted of five shows beginning April 17 in Brisbane, and ending on April 26 in Auckland. Lovato went on to complete the tour with her most extensive Asian tour to date, performing a total of six shows. The tour concluded on May 19 in Ho Chi Minh City to a crowd of 50,000.

Commercial performance
The album debuted at number three on the US Billboard 200 with first-week sales of 110,000 copies, behind Vampire Weekend's Modern Vampires of the City and George Strait's Love Is Everything, thus becoming the highest selling opening week of Lovato's career. In the United Kingdom, the album debuted at number ten on the UK Albums Chart, with sales of 10,658 copies sold in its first week. With the debut, it became Lovato's first album to breach the Top 40 in the country. The album was certified Gold in the US on September 16, 2014.

Singles
"Heart Attack" was released as the album's lead single on February 25, 2013. The song was written by Mitch Allan, Jason Evigan, Sean Douglas, Nikki Williams, Aaron Phillips and Lovato and produced by The Suspex. The song debuted at number 12 on the US Billboard Hot 100 chart, with first week sales of 215,000 copies, becoming a sales record for Lovato at the time. The song reached number 10 on the chart, becoming Lovato's third song to do so. The song also reached a peak at number 3 in the United Kingdom, her first single to reach the top ten in the country. The music video was filmed on March 14, 2013 and released on April 9, 2013. Lovato performed the song live on several shows, including The Ellen DeGeneres Show, Good Morning America and Jimmy Kimmel Live!. The song has since been certified 4× platinum in the United States, 2× platinum in Canada, as well as platinum in Denmark, New Zealand and Sweden, gold in Australia, Mexico and Ireland, and silver in the United Kingdom.

"Made in the USA" was released as the album's second single on July 16, 2013. Lovato performed the song live at several concerts including the 2013 edition of Wango Tango on May 11, 2013 and Good Morning Americas Summer Concert Series on June 28. The music video was released on July 17, 2013. It peaked at number 80 on the US Billboard Hot 100, managed to peak within the top 20 in Lebanon, as well at number 40 on the US Mainstream Top 40 and number 45 on the US Digital Songs charts.

"Neon Lights" was released as the album's third single on November 19, 2013. On September 29, 2013, Lovato announced the name of her concert tour, the Neon Lights Tour, and soon after that "Neon Lights" would become the third single from the album. The song, with its prominent EDM influences, covered new ground for Demi, who had been previously known for her pop ballad singles. The accompanying music video was released on November 21, 2013. In New Zealand, the song peaked at number 12 and was certified gold. It reached number 36 on the US Billboard Hot 100, peaking at this position for three non-consecutive weeks. It topped the US Hot Dance Club Songs and became Lovato's third top 10 single on the Mainstream Top 40, by reaching at number 7. It was certified platinum in the United States.

"Really Don't Care", featuring British recording artist Cher Lloyd, was released as the fourth single from the album on May 20, 2014. The week before it was officially serviced to US radio, it charted at number 7 at Mainstream Top 40, being Lovato's fourth top 10 single on the chart. It later on peaked at number one on the Billboard Dance Club Songs. The song debuted on the US Billboard Hot 100 at number 98, and has peaked at number 26. Lovato performed the song on several occasions before its official release as a single. Once released in May 2014, Lovato performed the song on the Season 13 live final of American Idol, Good Morning America Summer Concert Series, Late Night with Seth Meyers, and the 2014 Teen Choice Awards. "Really Don't Care" was later certified 2× platinum in the United States.

Track listing

DVD: Live in London

Notes
 signifies a vocal co-producer
 signifies a vocal producer

Personnel
Credits adapted from Demi.Performers and musiciansDemi Lovato – lead vocals
Cher Lloyd – vocals 
Felicia Barton – background vocals 
Battleroy – keys 
David Bukovinszky – cello 
Carl Falk – all instruments , guitars , background vocals 
Livvi Franc – background vocals 
Larry Goetz – guitars 
Andrew Goldstein – piano , guitar , keyboards 
Corky James – banjo , guitar 
Jonas Jeberg – all instruments 
Mattias Johansson – violin 
Emanuel Kiriakou – piano , guitar , keyboards 
Albin Nedler – background vocals 
Chris Patrick – background vocals 
Anton Patzner – viola , violin 
Lewis Patzner – cello 
Matt Rad – background vocals , piano , keyboards 
Jarrad Rogers – piano , drums , bass , guitars 
Jordan Sapp – additional guitars 
Jamie Snell – guitars 
Matt Squire – drums , keyboards , guitars 
Ryan Tedder – instrumentation 
Rami Yacoub – all instruments , bass 
Noel Zancanella – instrumentation ProductionMitch Allan – production 
Battleroy – production , programming 
Mattias Bylund – strings arrangement , strings recording , strings editing 
Smith Carlson – engineering 
Thomas Cullison – vocal engineering assistant 
Brendan Dekora – engineering 
Jason Evigan – production , co-production , vocal production 
Carl Falk – production , programming , vocal recording 
Chris Gehringer – mastering
Serban Ghenea – mixing
Larry Goetz – engineering 
Andrew Goldstein – production , programming 
John Hanes – engineered for mix
Adam Harr – engineering assistant 
Jonas Jeberg – production , programming 
Micah Johnson – engineering assistant 
Emanuel Kiriakou – production , string arrangements , programming 
Jens Koerkemeier – engineering , digital editing 
Savan Kotecha – vocal recording 
Davis Meissner – engineering assistant 
The Monsters and the Strangerz – production 
Kyle Moorman – engineering 
Albin Nedler – vocal editing 
Chris Patrick – vocal editing 
Anton Patzner – string arrangements 
Anne Preven – vocal production 
David "DQ" Quiñones – vocal production 
Matt Rad – production , engineering , drum programming , string arrangements 
Jarrad Rogers – production , programming 
Matt Squire – production , engineering , programming 
Zach Steele – vocal engineering 
Ryan Tedder – production , programming 
Pat Thrall – digital editing 
Steve Tippeconnic – engineering 
Josh Wilbur – engineering , vocal recording 
Rami Yacoub – production , programming , vocal editing , vocal recording 
Noel Zancanella – production , programming Design and management'

Eddie De La Garza – management
Enny Joo – art direction, design
Philymack – management
Rankin – photography
Dave Snow – creative direction
Mio Vukovic – A&R
Sarah Yeo – A&R coordination

Charts

Weekly charts

Year-end charts

Certifications

Release history

See also
 List of number-one albums of 2013 (Canada)

References

2013 albums
Albums produced by Billy Steinberg
Albums produced by Emanuel Kiriakou
Albums produced by Rami Yacoub
Albums produced by Ryan Tedder
Demi Lovato albums
Hollywood Records albums
Albums produced by Jason Evigan